Bulbul is a family of songbirds.

Bulbul may also refer to:

Bulbul, Syria, a town
Bulbul (singer) (1897-1961), Azerbaijani singer and Soviet opera tenor born Murtuza Mammadov
Bulbul Chowdhury (1919-1954), Bengali dancer
Bulbul Hussain (born 1972), British wheelchair rugby player
Bulbul (2013 film), a Kannada film directed by M. D. Shridhar
Bulbul (2019 film), a Nepalese film directed by Binod Paudel
Bulbbul, 2020 Indian horror film
Cyclone Bulbul 2019
Bulbul-e-Bangalah, Persian poet of Bengal

People with the surname
Ahmed Imtiaz Bulbul, Bangladeshi lyricist, composer and music director
Aminul Islam Bulbul (born 1968), Bangladeshi cricketer
Zózimo Bulbul (1937–2013), Brazilian actor, film director and activist

Distinguish from
Bulbil (on a plant, a side shoot or side bud that drops off and takes root)